Yoshiko Wakabayashi (born 21 May 1950) is a Brazilian computer scientist and applied mathematician whose research interests include combinatorial optimization, polyhedral combinatorics, packing problems, and graph algorithms. She is a professor in the department of computer science and institute of mathematics and statistics at the University of São Paulo.

Education and career
After earning bachelor's and master's degrees in applied mathematics at the University of São Paulo in 1972 and  1977 respectively, Wakabayashi went to the University of Augsburg in Germany for doctoral study in applied mathematics, completing her doctorate (Dr. rer. nat.) in 1986. Her dissertation, Aggregation of Binary Relations: Algorithmic and Polyhedral Investigations, was supervised by Martin Grötschel.

She became an assistant professor at the University of São Paulo in 1977, associate professor in 1995, and full professor in 2006.

Recognition
Wakabayashi was named as a commander of the National Order of Scientific Merit in 2010.

In 2020 the Brazilian Computer Society gave her their prize for scientific merit.

References

External links
Home page

1950 births
Living people
Brazilian computer scientists
Brazilian women computer scientists
Brazilian mathematicians
Brazilian women mathematicians
University of São Paulo alumni
University of Augsburg alumni
Academic staff of the University of São Paulo
Commanders of the National Order of Scientific Merit (Brazil)
Members of the Brazilian Academy of Sciences